Villa Reynolds is a town of the General Pedernera department on the San Luis Province, Argentina.

It has an airport that served the city and is also a military airbase home of the V Air Brigade of Argentine Air Force. In March 1973 two Skylark sounding rockets were launched.

Climate
Villa Reynolds has a humid subtropical climate (Cfa) with long, hot summers and short, cool winters.

References

Populated places in San Luis Province